Tarjei Sandvik Moe (born 24 May 1999) is a Norwegian actor. He rose to fame with his portrayal of Isak Valtersen, the main character in the third season of Norwegian teen drama series Skam. His acting, and the third season of the series as a whole, received widespread critical acclaim for a non-stereotypical display of homosexuality, and resulted in him and co-star Henrik Holm winning two prestigious Norwegian awards.

Following the conclusion of Skam, Moe performed in the Norwegian theater adaptation of Grease and appeared in the 2018 erotic thriller film .

Career
Tarjei Sandvik Moe portrayed Isak Valtersen in the Norwegian teen drama series Skam (2015-2017), appearing in all four seasons of the series, but receiving prominence as the main character in the third season. The season, as well as his character, received widespread acclaim for showing homosexual love without resorting to stereotypical presentations of storylines or personalities, and caused the series to become a global phenomenon, with international viewers following the series through unofficial translations on social media.

For his portrayal of the character, Sandvik Moe was nominated for "Best Actor" at the 2017 Gullruten awards, an annual Norwegian awards ceremony for the country's TV industry. Although he lost in that category, he nevertheless won two other major awards; the "Audience Award", shared along with co-star Henrik Holm, and "TV Moment of the Year", for the final scene in the penultimate episode of the third season. At the awards ceremony, the two men also made headlines in Norway for a spontaneous kiss on live television during a "kiss cam" moment, despite the fact that the event was not coordinated with the actors beforehand. The producer of the awards ceremony did not intend to force the actors to kiss, planning instead of making the award hosts humorously say that "we've seen it before" and make the camera pan out. Sandvik Moe and Holm told Norwegian press afterwards that they did not expect it, but described the scenario as "we're used to it", with reference to kissing as a frequently requested activity between them at parties they'd both attended in the past.

In February 2018, Moe, together with Iman Meskini, another co-star from the series, were invited to the Royal Palace for dinner, and had the honor of meeting the Duke and Duchess of Cambridge, Prince William and Duchess Kate. Prince William and Duchess Kate visited the school where Skam was filmed, where they discussed the impact of the TV show for people around the world with more members of the series' cast.

In June 2017, Sandvik Moe was announced as playing the character Doody in a Norwegian theater adaptation of Grease, which premiered in January 2018. The following month, he landed a role in the 2018 feature film An Affair, an erotic thriller centering on a teacher having an affair with a student. Also in August, Moe was the presenter for the Best Actress award at Norway's annual film awards, Amandaprisen, and was presenter of the announcement of nominees for the 2017 Nordic Council Film Prize.

Personal life
Sandvik Moe attended the Norwegian school Hartvig Nissen.

In September 2018, Sandvik Moe guest-starred on the Norwegian talk show Senkveld and was asked about his decision to not disclose his sexual orientation to the public. He responded that his sexuality is a "private matter" and further elaborated: "A human is much more than their sexual orientation. I don't want there to be any big headlines that 'he's hetero' or 'he's gay' or anything like that. I am an actor, that's what I am. So that's what I'm trying to focus on, and that's why it's not important for me to put any focus on whether I like boys or girls".

Filmography

Film and television

Theater

References

External links
 
 Agency

1999 births
21st-century Norwegian male actors
Living people
Male actors from Oslo
Norwegian male television actors